Tanart Sathienthirakul (born 29 November 1992 in Bangkok) is a racing driver from Thailand. He currently competes in the Blancpain GT World Challenge Asia for Porsche having previously competed in Formula 3.

Racing record

Career summary

*Season in progress

References

External links
Official website
Profile at Driver Database

1992 births
Living people
Tanart Sathienthirakul
Tanart Sathienthirakul
24H Series drivers
Toyota Racing Series drivers
Formula Renault Eurocup drivers
Formula Renault 2.0 NEC drivers
Euroformula Open Championship drivers
FIA Formula 3 European Championship drivers
Asian Le Mans Series drivers
Formula Masters China drivers
M2 Competition drivers
Manor Motorsport drivers
MP Motorsport drivers
Team West-Tec drivers
Motopark Academy drivers
RP Motorsport drivers
Eurasia Motorsport drivers
Karting World Championship drivers
Tanart Sathienthirakul
Tanart Sathienthirakul
Porsche Motorsports drivers
R-ace GP drivers
ART Grand Prix drivers